Aykhan Farzukh oglu Abbasov (born 25 August 1981) is an Azeri professional football manager and former player. He works for Turan-Tovuz.

Career
On 27 December 2016, Abbasov was appointed as manager of Zira FK until the end of the 2016–17 season.

On 16 December 2021, Abbasov left his role as Head Coach of Sumgayit.

References

External links
 Club profile 

Living people
1981 births
Azerbaijani footballers
Azerbaijan under-21 international footballers
Azerbaijani football managers
Qarabağ FK players
Footballers from Baku
FK MKT Araz players

Association football midfielders